OSHA or Osha may refer to:

Work
 Occupational Safety and Health Administration, a federal agency of the United States that regulates workplace safety and health
 Occupational Safety and Health Act (United States) of 1970, a federal law in the United States, the act that created the Occupational Safety and Health Administration mentioned above
 Occupational Safety and Health Act 1994, a national law of Malaysia
 European Agency for Safety and Health at Work, an agency of the European Union
 The Division of Occupational Safety and Health (DOSH) of the California Department of Industrial Relations, a California state government agency better known as Cal/OSHA

Other
Osha River, a river in Russia
Osha (herb), a perennial herb
Osha (A Song of Ice and Fire), a character in George R. R. Martin's fictional A Song of Ice and Fire fantasy series
Osha, characters from the World of Warcraft video games

See also
Occupational Health and Safety Act (disambiguation)
Usha, Israel, a kibbutz in Israel